The 2017 FIVB Volleyball Women's World Grand Champions Cup was the 7th staging of the FIVB Volleyball World Grand Champions Cup, a quadrennial international women's volleyball tournament organized by the Fédération Internationale de Volleyball (FIVB). The tournament was held in Tokyo and Nagoya, Japan from 5 to 10 September 2017. 6 national teams from 4 confederations competed in the tournament.

China claimed their second title at the tournament with an unbeaten record. Brazil claimed the silver after a face-off in the final round with United States who finished third. Zhu Ting from China was elected the MVP.

Qualification
The FIVB announced the best four ranked continents in the 2016 Olympic Games were eligible to participate in the tournament. Asia, Europe, North America, and South America confederations were eligible to send representatives. The representatives were determined by their continental ranking at the Olympic tournament. The four teams will join the host team and a wild card team which to compete for the World Grand Champion Cup title.

Qualified teams
The following teams qualified for the tournament.

Venues

Competition formula 
The competition formula of the 2017 Women's World Grand Champions Cup was a single Round-Robin system. Each team played once against each of the five remaining teams. Points were accumulated during the whole tournament, and the final standing was determined by the total points gained.

Match officials

Squads

Pool standing procedure 
 Number of matches won
 Match points
 Sets ratio
 Points ratio
 If the tie continues as per the point ratio between two teams, the priority will be given to the team which won the last match between them. When the tie in points ratio is between three or more teams, a new classification of these teams in the terms of points 1, 2 and 3 will be made taking into consideration only the matches in which they were opposed to each other.
Match won 3–0 or 3–1: 3 match points for the winner, 0 match points for the loser.
Match won 3–2: 2 match points for the winner, 1 match point for the loser.

Results 
 All times are Japan Standard Time (UTC+09:00).

|}

Tokyo round

|}

Nagoya round

|}

Final standing

Awards

Most Valuable Player
  Zhu Ting
Best Setter
  Koyomi Tominaga
Best Outside Spikers
  Zhu Ting
  Jordan Larson

Best Middle Blockers
  Ana Carolina da Silva
  Yuan Xinyue
Best Opposite Spiker
  Tandara Caixeta
Best Libero
  Kotoe Inoue

See also
 2017 FIVB Volleyball Men's World Grand Champions Cup

References

External links
Tournament website

2017 Women
FIVB Volleyball
FIVB Volleyball
International volleyball competitions hosted by Japan
September 2017 sports events in Asia